Chad Hedrick (born April 17, 1977) is an American inline speed skater and ice speed skater. He was born in Spring, Texas.

Hedrick revolutionized the inline speed skating world with his unique technique, called the double push, or DP. During his career he won 93 national championships and 50 world championships, as well as having a brand of inline skating wheels named after him.

Speed skating 
After winning his 50th World Championship, in Ostend, Belgium, in 2002, he switched to ice speed skating after watching, on a television in a Las Vegas casino in 2002, fellow inline skater Derek Parra win a medal at the Salt Lake City Winter Olympics. In February 2004, a year and a half after he made his switch, Hedrick won the 2004 World Allround Speed Skating Championships, knocking more than a point off the world record points, reducing it to 150.478. On March 12, 2004, Hedrick won the gold medal in the 5,000 meters during the 2004 World Single Distance Championships, which were held Seoul, South Korea. In 2005 he successfully defended his 5,000 m world title in Inzell, Germany. At the 2005 World Allround Speed Skating Championships he lost his title to Shani Davis. Hedrick has set six world records in speed skating, but these have later been broken by others. , he was 4th in the unofficial world ranking, the Adelskalender after having led the rankings from November 2005-7.

2006 Winter Olympic Games 
The Texan raised the stakes for the Winter Olympics 2006 in Turin by proclaiming that he would equal Eric Heiden's record of five gold medals.  On February 11, 2006, Hedrick won his only gold medal at this Olympics at the  5,000 m beating Sven Kramer of the Netherlands who claimed a silver medal.

Hedrick caused controversy when he insisted that Shani Davis, fellow American speed skater in the 1,000 m race, should have participated in the men's pursuit, stating, "I don't see what his logic is. We can't be beat if he skates. It's his decision. I'm not going to get in the middle of it. I would like him to be in the pursuit, but am I going to beg him? No." Five-time gold medalist and Olympic-team physician, Eric Heiden, has publicly written that Davis made the right choice in not participating in the team pursuit and thereby not jeopardizing his chances at a gold medal in his best event, the 1,000 meter race.  Davis eventually won the gold medal in the 1000 m race, while Hedrick finished sixth.

Hedrick added a silver medal in the 10,000 m to his Olympic tally along with a bronze medal in the 1,500 m. With three medals, Hedrick became only the third American ever to win three speed skating medals in a single Winter Olympics winning a medal in each color (gold, silver, and bronze).

Post-Torino career 
On March 5, 2006, Hedrick won a 1500 m race in the Netherlands and captured the 2006 World Cup title in the event. Two weeks later, Hedrick participated in the World Allround Championships in Calgary, aiming to take back the title he lost to Davis in 2005. On the fourth and final distance, the 10,000 meter, Hedrick needed to beat Davis by 8.32 seconds, but made a crucial mistake midway through the race; he turned into the inner lane instead of his scheduled outer, and though he realised his mistake quickly, he was motioned off some laps later.

2010 Winter Olympic Games 
Hedrick qualified for the 1000 m, 1500 m, 5000 m, and the long-track team pursuit in the 21st Winter Olympiad held in Vancouver. Hedrick lost to Håvard Bøkko in the final pair of the 5000 m event. He would ultimately finish 10 places behind the winner, Dutchman Sven Kramer, in 11th place. Hedrick skated a 1:09.32 in the 1000 m which was good for the bronze behind Davis and South Korea's Mo Tae-bum. Hedrick was the leader of the team that won a surprising silver medal in team pursuit with an upset of the heavily favored Netherlands team in the semifinals bringing Hedrick's Olympic career to an end with a total of five medals with each one in a different event.

Personal bests

Source: speedskatingbase.eu & SpeedskatingResults.com

World ice speedskating records 

Hedrick has so far skated six world records on ice skates

Source: SpeedSkatingStats.com

World Titles Inline Skating 
Hedrick has won the following world titles in inline skating:

U.S. and world roller speed skating records 
 National roller skating record in the 3,000 meters relay race (1993)
 National inline skating record in the 5,000 meters relay race (1998)
 National inline skating record in the 3,000 meters male-female relay race (1998)
 National inline skating record in the 1,500 meters race (1996)
 National outdoor track record in the 1,000 and 1,500 meters races (1999 and 1998 respectively)
 National outdoor track record in the 15,000 meters race (1998)
 National outdoor road record in the 500 and 1,000 meters races (2001)
 National outdoor road record in the 1,500 meters race (1998)
 National outdoor road record in the 10,000 meters race (2001)
 World outdoor road record in the 1,500 meters race (1999)
 World outdoor road record in the 10,000 meters race (1996)
 World outdoor road record in the 15,000 meters race (2000)

Personal life 
On June 7, 2008, Hedrick and Lynsey Elizabeth Adams were married in Houston, Texas. Their wedding was featured on the Style Network reality show Whose Wedding Is It Anyway? They had their first daughter in 2009, a second daughter in 2010, and a son in 2014.  Hedrick currently works as a licensed realtor.

References

External links 

 Official website (archive)
 Chad Hedrick's U.S. Olympic Team bio (archive)
 Chad Hedrick at SpeedSkatingStats.com
 Photos of Chad Hedrick
 OffThePodium.com
 Current Adelskalender
 SpeedskatingBase.eu PB's Chad with a link to Results International Championships
 AP Winter Games Profile: Chad Hedrick
 Associated Press: Davis, Hedrick carving quite an Olympic legacy
 
 
 

1977 births
Living people
American roller skaters
American male speed skaters
Sportspeople from Houston
Speed skaters at the 2006 Winter Olympics
Speed skaters at the 2010 Winter Olympics
Olympic gold medalists for the United States in speed skating
Olympic silver medalists for the United States in speed skating
Olympic bronze medalists for the United States in speed skating
World record setters in speed skating
Medalists at the 2010 Winter Olympics
Medalists at the 2006 Winter Olympics
Pan American Games medalists in roller skating
Pan American Games gold medalists for the United States
Pan American Games silver medalists for the United States
Pan American Games bronze medalists for the United States
People from Spring, Texas
World Allround Speed Skating Championships medalists
World Single Distances Speed Skating Championships medalists
Competitors at the 1995 Pan American Games
Competitors at the 1999 Pan American Games
Competitors at the 2001 World Games
World Games gold medalists
World Games bronze medalists
Medalists at the 1995 Pan American Games
Medalists at the 1999 Pan American Games
Inline speed skaters
20th-century American people
21st-century American people